Tahiti national beach soccer team represents Tahiti or French Polynesia in international beach soccer competitions and is controlled by the FTF and the FFF, the governing body for football in Tahiti. In contrast to the fortunes of the association football team, Tahiti's beach soccer has, since 2011, been one of the strongest teams in world beach soccer. The team made history at the 2013 FIFA Beach Soccer World Cup by becoming the first Pacific nation to qualify for the knockout stages of an international FIFA tournament. 
At the 2015 FIFA Beach Soccer World Cup  Tahiti beat Italy in a penalty shootout to become the first Pacific nation to ever make it to a final in a FIFA tournament. They followed this up with another appearance in the 2017 final.

Results and fixtures

The following is a list of match results in the last 12 months, as well as any future matches that have been scheduled.

Legend

2021

Players

Current squad
The following players and staff members were called up for the 2021 FIFA Beach Soccer World Cup.

Head coach: Teva Zaveroni

Competitive record

FIFA Beach Soccer World Cup

Intercontinental Cup

OFC Beach Soccer Nations Cup

Head-to-head record

Note: The following does not include a small handful of friendly matches Tahiti have played over four periods or ending in a draw. These have been discounted as they are not by the official rules of FIFA. Friendlies and competitive games are all included.

Since making their international debut in August 2006, Tahiti have played a total of 107 matches against 39 different national teams, 59 of which were won. Their most played fixture is against Switzerland and Russia whom they have played 8 times each.

Honours
OFC Beach Soccer Championship
Winners: 2011, 2019
FIFA Beach Soccer World Cup
Runners-up: 2015, 2017
Fourth place: 2013

References

External links
Tahiti at BSWW
 Tahiti at Beach Soccer Russia

Oceanian national beach soccer teams
Beach Soccer
National team